The Number 10 Policy Unit is a body of policymakers based in 10 Downing Street, providing policy advice directly to the British Prime Minister.  Originally set up to support Harold Wilson in 1974, it has gone through a series of guises to suit the needs of successive prime ministers, staffed variously by political advisers, civil servants and more recently a combination of both.

Since 2010

The Coalition Government of May 2010 quickly disbanded two major parts of central infrastructure built by Tony Blair, the Prime Minister's Delivery Unit (PMDU) and Prime Minister's Strategy Unit (PMSU), as part of the Prime Minister's agenda to reduce the number of special advisers and end the micromanagement of Whitehall. In their place, a strengthened Policy and Implementation Unit was launched in early 2011 by the Cabinet Secretary, staffed wholly by civil servants and reporting jointly to the Prime Minister and Deputy Prime Minister under joint heads Paul Kirby (Policy) and Kris Murrin (Implementation).

Members of the Policy Unit in 2010 were  Gavin Lockhart-Mirams (Home Affairs), Sean Worth (Health and Adult Social Care), Chris Brown (Education), Richard Freer (Defence), Tim Luke (Business and Enterprise), Michael Lynas (Big Society) and Ben Moxham (Energy and Environment).  The Unit wass supported by the Research and Analytics Unit.

Since 2019

Munira Mirza was appointed director of the Policy Unit when Boris Johnson became Prime Minister. She had previously been Deputy Mayor of London with responsibility for Education and Culture under Johnson during his time as Mayor of London. Mirza resigned on 4 February 2022 after Johnson failed to apologise for making misleading remarks that implied that Keir Starmer failed to prosecute Jimmy Savile while the latter was Director of Public Prosecutions.

Andrew Griffith MP was appointed to replace Mirza as the director of the Policy Unit until 8 July 2022. As a sitting MP, he was also appointed as Parliamentary Secretary (Minister for Policy and Head of the Prime Minister's Policy Unit). The role was left vacant from 8 July 2022, as Johnson announced his resignation as party leader, with a view to remaining as a caretaker prime minister until his successor had been chosen. 

The vacant post was filled by Jamie Hope on 6 September 2022 as part of the short-lived Truss ministry.

When Rishi Sunak became prime minister in October 2022, Eleanor Shawcross, the daughter of the Commissioner for Public Appointments, William Shawcross and grand-daughter of the barrister Hartley Shawcross, became director of the Policy Unit. She had previously donated £20,000 to his leadership campaign, having advised him while he was Chancellor of the Exchequer. Shawcross had previously spent 6 years as deputy chief of staff to George Osborne during his time as Chancellor, and chief of staff at the Department of Work and Pensions where she was later made a non-executive director.

List of Directors of the Policy Unit

See also
Central Policy Review Staff
Prime Minister's Office

References 

British Prime Minister's Office
Public bodies and task forces of the United Kingdom government
Public policy in the United Kingdom
1974 establishments in the United Kingdom
10 Downing Street